Blidinje Lake, is alpine lake located in Blidinje Nature Park, on karstic Blidinje plateau, Bosnia and Herzegovina, between Jablanica, Tomislavgrad and Posušje, and is largest of its kind in the country. The lake is most important hydrogeological feature of the park and indeed entire Dinaric Alps karst within Bosnia and Hezegovina.

Characteristics
The lake area varies from 2.5 to 6 km2, and the average depth is about 1.9 m.

Blidinje lake is direct result of a glacial retreat, however, according to the Poklečani parochial office documents and recent research into matter of karst hydrology of the plateau, the lake is, also, a product of anthropogenic intervention and activities of human inhabitants. According to these documents, the lake is artificial and it was created at the end of the 19th century. In order to keep the water that is lost through the subterranean passage, local residents and cattle breeders sealed sinkholes with branches and clay, so that water could not find its way underground. Therefore, the lake was formed. Its surface area varies between 2,5 and 6 km², while its average depth is 1,9 m, with altitude of 1.184 m a.s.l.

See also 
List of lakes in Bosnia and Herzegovina
List of mountains in Bosnia and Herzegovina
List of protected areas of Bosnia and Herzegovina

References

External links

 Blidinje Nature Park
 Diva Blidinje
 Doljani

Lakes of Bosnia and Herzegovina
Blidinje plateau